Pierre-Yves Borgeaud (born August 25, 1963 in Monthey, Switzerland) is a Swiss film director. Borgeaud has a bachelor's degree in arts at the Lausanne University in 1990, with a thesis about the influence of jazz on French writers (Paul Morand, Boris Vian, Jean-Paul Sartre and Louis-Ferdinand Céline). He has worked as an independent journalist, writing about music and moving images in different media. He also played the drums in jazz and funk bands and worked as a music producer.

In 1996, Pierre-Yves Borgeaud is studying at the New York University and obtains a certificate at the dpt. of Film, Video & Broadcasting. Since 97, he’s working on documentaries and music videos, especially for the ECM label in Germany. He also participates to a video installation workshop at the Film/Video Arts, New York. In 1998, he becomes one of the Swiss pioneers of VJing, presenting live performances with musicians like Pierre Audétat, Christy Doran, Nils Petter Molvaer or Don Li (composer/musician).

Director, producer, and interdisciplinary artist, Borgeaud founded Momentum Production in 1999. In 2000, he receives the price "Young artist" in video awarded by a council of the arts in Switzerland. In 2003, his first long feature iXieme: diary of a prisoner is awarded with the Golden Leopard in Video at the Locarno International Film Festival. In 2004, the short film Interface is nominated for the best Swiss short film. In 2008, his film Return to Goree, with Senegalese superstar Youssou N'Dour, is distributed and awarded worldwide. Best Documentary at the 16th Pan African Film Festival in Los Angeles.

In 2013, Pierre-Yves Borgeaud's new long feature documentary, Viramundo with Brazilian singer, composer and icon Gilberto Gil is presented for the world premiere at the Visions du Réel Film Festival in Nyon and distributed worldwide. The film also inaugurates the T.I.D.E. Experiment for pan-European and multi-support releases.

Selected filmography
Viramundo: a musical journey with Gilberto Gil, a long feature documentary with the Brazilian musician and ex-minister of culture promoting the power of cultural diversity around the Southern hemisphere (2013).

Subjective Cinema. An experimental film shot with some inhabitants of Mireuil in the suburbs of French town La Rochelle, a carte blanche given by the International Film Festival La Rochelle (2009).

Return to Gorée. A musical documentary with African singer Youssou N’Dour, Amiri Baraka, Idris Muhammad and others. A road movie on the paths of jazz and slavery (2007).

Family Music. A musical and biographical documentary with Austrian brothers Christian et Wolfgang Muthspiel. Coproduction Swiss TV SF DRS (2004).

iXième : diary of a prisoner. A video diary of a home prisoner. Written with Stéphane Blok. Golden Leopard, Video Competition, Locarno International Film Festival (2003).

Interface: cartography 3. Short feature film with the dance company , Lausanne. Nominated for Swiss Film Prize in 2004 (2003).

Stimmhorn: In Land. A musical film as a composition with duo Stimmhorn (Balthasar Streiff, alphorns, and Christian Zehnder, overtone singing). Produced by SF-DRS, dpt. Music & dance. (2001).

Music Hotel. Some musicians associated to the ECM label are working together during a very special festival in Germany. With Manfred Eicher, Tomasz Stanko, John Surman, Dino Saluzzi (1998).

Swiss Jam: swiss musicians in New York. The cross portraits of composers Peter Scherer, Daniel Schnyder, Christian Marclay and Alex Bugnon. Coproduction with Télévision Suisse Romande. (1999).

Miles post mortem. A short documentary about producer Bill Laswell (re)mixing the original tapes of Miles Davis. Broadcast on the European channel Arte (1998).

Nils Petter Molvaer: Song of Sand. Music video for ECM Records. Broadcast on MTV, Viva, M6, and other channels. (1997).

Video performances and other works
The white space of Mumbai. Music and video performance with Don Li, Sujay Bobade, Norbert Pfammater and Wolfgang Zwiauer (2010).

Le Module. An art installation presenting the images of medically assisted procreation (2009).

Premier Cri, dernier Souffle. A stage performance for music and live video with duo Stimmhorn, Christian Zehnder and Balthasar Streiff. Presented in main theaters in Switzerland since March 2006.

New Ballet for Xala. Conception et direction of a multi-angle DVD including a documentary with dancer and musician Ania Losinger (Xala) and Don Li (composition). Tonus-music / Musikvertrieb (2005).

Time Experience. Music & video performance premiered at the Willisau Jazz Festival. With Don Li (composition, clarinets), Ania Losinger (Xala) a.o. (2003).

The Longest Journey. Music & video installation with Don Li (composition, clarinets), Ania Losinger (Xala), Björn Meyer (bass) and Jojo Mayer (drums). Premiere at the Swiss Peaks festival in New York, March 2003. Installation presented at the Musée de l'Élysée, Lausanne, February to May 2004.

One, Three, One. Live and prepared video images for a concert performance with Leonzio Cherubini (drums, composition), Jacques Demierre (piano), Urs Leimgruber (saxophones) and Katharina Vogel (danser) (2000).

My Body Electric. Video and music concert/performance with Pierre Audétat (keyboards, sampler) and Nils Petter Molvaer (trumpet). Premiere at the Jazz Festival Cully 2000 (2000).

Eye in the City. Live video and music performance with guitarist Christy Doran. Première at the Jazz Festival Lausanne / Onze Plus. (1999).

References

External links
 
 Films (extracts) by Pierre-Yves Borgeaud on Vimeo

1963 births
Living people
Interdisciplinary artists
Swiss film directors
People from Monthey